William Morris Pierson (June 14, 1899 – February 20, 1959) was a Major League Baseball pitcher who played from  to , and again in  with the Philadelphia Athletics. He batted and threw left-handed.

External links

1899 births
1959 deaths
Major League Baseball pitchers
Baseball players from New Jersey
Sportspeople from Atlantic City, New Jersey
Philadelphia Athletics players
Suffolk Nuts players